OmniBSIC Bank Ghana Limited is a commercial bank in Ghana that is licensed by the Bank of Ghana, the central bank and national banking regulator.

It was created by the merger of the erstwhile Omni Bank Ghana Limited and BSIC Ghana Bank Limited.

Location
The headquarters of the bank and its main branch, are located at
Atlantic Tower, Airport City, in Accra, Ghana's capital. As of April 2020, the geographical coordinates of OmniBSIC Bank's headquarters are:05°36'31.0"N, 0°12'31.0"W (Latitude:5.608611; Longitude:-0.208611).

Overview
OmniBSIC Bank Ghana Limited is a retail bank that serves large corporations, small and medium enterprises, individuals and non-governmental organisations in Ghana. As of March 2019, the bank's total assets were GHS:1.22 billion (approx. US$215 million), with shareholders' equity of in excess of GHS:400 million (approx. US$70 million). At that time, the bank served over 125,000 customers at 46 brick-and mortar branches and  employed 614 permanent staff members.

History
In September 2017, the Bank of Ghana directed all universal banks in Ghana to raise their minimum capital reserves from GHS:120 million (US$22.8 million) to GHS:400 million (US$73.4 million). Institutions that couldn't raise the funds internally or from shareholders, could (a) merge (b) exit the Ghanaian banking business (Bank of Baroda (Ghana)) (c) downsize to a savings and loan institution or (c) consolidate (Consolidated Bank Ghana). 

OmniBank Ghana and Sahel Sahara Bank (BSIC) decided to merge to form OmniBSIC Bank  Ghana Limited, effective 4 March 2020.

Branches
The bank's headquarters are located at: C9/14 Olusegun Obasanjo Way, Dzorwulu, Accra. The bank maintains a networked chain of 46 branches in major urban areas of the country.

Governance
Simeon Patrick Kyei is the chairman of the board of directors.  Daniel Asiedu serves as the chief executive officer of the bank.

See also
 List of banks in Ghana
 List of companies of Ghana
 Economy of Ghana

References

External links
 Official Website

Banks of Ghana
Accra
Banks established in 2020
Ghanaian companies established in 2020